Alfred Chen or Chen Fei-lung ; born 2 October 1937) is a Taiwanese business executive and former politician.

Education
Alfred Chen studied foreign languages at Tamkang University before attending the University of San Francisco.

Business career
 was established in 1952 as a chemical manufacturing company specializing in soapmaking. After  stepped aside, his eldest son Alfred Chen assumed control of the company. Nanchow diversified into the manufacturing of frozen dough, cookies, noodles, and cooking oil. It also imported Häagen-Dazs and Kellogg's products. Namchow owns the Duroyal brand, and manufactured ice cream for FamilyMart. The company also supplied oil to McDonald's and MOS Burger in Taiwan.

Under Alfred Chen's leadership, in 1991, Namchow opened its first factory in Thailand. In 2004, Namchow opened a Russian restaurant in Taipei. In 2008, the company announced plans to produce food and beverages for a wide range of franchise businesses. In 2011, Chen planned to sell off the company's land in Datong District, Taipei, because  much of the property became unused after operations were shifted to Taoyuan in 1992.

During the 2014 Taiwan food scandal, Chen urged the government to bring the nation's food safety standards in line with international norms. Government agencies subsequently discovered that documentation Namchow submitted for customs review had labeled batches of its imported oil as industrial cooking oil. Chen claimed that mistakes were made on the forms, and the Taipei City Government's Department of Health fined Namchow NT$30 million. FamilyMart subsequently announced that it would no longer sell ice cream manufactured by Namchow. Namchow products were quickly pulled from shelves, and an investigation showed that the company met safety standards.

In 2018, Namchow Food Group (Shanghai) Company, a subsidiary of Namchow Group, began exploring the possibility of an initial public offering on the Shanghai Stock Exchange.

Political career
Alfred Chen accepted a nomination from the People First Party, and was placed on its party list for the 2001 legislative elections. For running as a PFP candidate, Chen was expelled from the Kuomintang. Following the withdrawal of at-large legislator Liu Sung-pan from the People First Party, Chen was appointed to the Legislative Yuan. He took office on 14 September 2004, and completed Liu's term, through 31 January 2005.

References

1937 births
Living people
Taiwanese chairpersons of corporations
Tamkang University alumni
University of San Francisco alumni
Members of the 5th Legislative Yuan
20th-century Taiwanese businesspeople
21st-century Taiwanese businesspeople
Party List Members of the Legislative Yuan
People First Party Members of the Legislative Yuan
Chinese Civil War refugees
Kuomintang politicians in Taiwan
Expelled members of the Kuomintang